The 1976–77 UNLV Runnin' Rebels basketball team represented the University of Nevada Las Vegas in NCAA Division I men's competition in the 1976–77 season. The team was led by head coach Jerry Tarkanian and played its home games in the Las Vegas Convention Center. This season marked the school's first appearance in the Final Four. The Rebels finished with an overall record of 29–3 and were ranked No. 4 in the final AP poll.

This team, nicknamed the Hardway Eight, is credited with paving the way in establishing UNLV as a national contender from the late 1970s through the early 1990s.

Roster

Schedule and results

|-
!colspan=12 style=| Regular season

|-
!colspan=12 style=| NCAA Tournament

Rankings

Team players drafted into the NBA

See also
UNLV Runnin' Rebels basketball
1977 NCAA Division I men's basketball tournament

References

External links
 UNLV Runnin' Rebels Official site 

Unlv
UNLV Runnin' Rebels basketball seasons
NCAA Division I men's basketball tournament Final Four seasons
Unlv
UNLV Runnin' Rebels basketball team
UNLV Runnin' Rebels basketball team